HMS Salisbury was a 50-gun fourth rate ship of the line of the Royal Navy, built by Richard and James Herring at Baileys Hard (near Bucklers Hard) on the Beaulieu River in Hampshire, England and launched on 18 April 1698.

Salisbury was commissioned in 1699 under her first commander, Captain Richard Lestock. The following year she joined Admiral George Rooke's fleet in the Baltic, and remained with Rooke off Dunkirk in 1701. Lestock was succeeded by Captain Richard Cotton, but while off Orford Ness on 10 April 1703 she encountered and was attacked by a squadron consisting of four French warships, including the Adroit, and three privateers. After an engagement which left 17 killed and 34 wounded, Salisbury was taken by the French. She served with the French under the name Salisbury, and for a time was part of Claude de Forbin's squadron.

On 1 May 1707, Salisbury very nearly fell back into English hands. Salisbury was part of the Dunkirk Squadron that attacked the English convoy commanded by Baron Wylde, during the action of 2 May 1707. Captain George Clements lost his life in defence of HMS Hampton Court, but not before his crew so disabled Salisbury that she was left for a wreck, later recovered by the French who could not fit her out in time for their next warring exploit.

She was renamed HMS Salisbury Prize, as a new  had already been built. She was renamed HMS Preston on 2 January 1716.

On 8 May 1739 Preston was ordered to be taken to pieces and rebuilt at Plymouth according to the 1733 proposals of the 1719 Establishment, and was relaunched on 18 September 1742. From 1745 she was assigned to the Royal Navy's East Indies squadron which was based in the Dutch-held port of Trincomalee, Ceylon. In September 1748 she was declared unseaworthy and converted into a hulk. Over the following year she served as a storehouse for naval supplies and a support for the careening of other vessels, and was broken up in November 1749.

See also
List of ships captured in the 18th century

Notes

References

 

Lavery, Brian (2003) The Ship of the Line - Volume 1: The development of the battlefleet 1650-1850. Conway Maritime Press. .
 

Ships of the line of the Royal Navy
1690s ships
Captured ships
Ships built on the Beaulieu River